Editing is the process of selecting and preparing written, photographic, visual, audible, or cinematic material used by a person or an entity to convey a message or information. The editing process can involve correction, condensation, organisation, and many other modifications performed with an intention of producing a correct, consistent, accurate and complete piece of work.

The editing process often begins with the author's idea for the work itself, continuing as a collaboration between the author and the editor as the work is created. Editing can involve creative skills, human relations and a precise set of methods.

There are various editorial positions in publishing. Typically, one finds editorial assistants reporting to the senior-level editorial staff and directors who report to senior executive editors. Senior executive editors are responsible for developing a product for its final release. The smaller the publication, the more these roles overlap.

The top editor at many publications may be known as the chief editor, executive editor, or simply the editor. A frequent and highly regarded contributor to a magazine may acquire the title of editor-at-large or contributing editor. Mid-level newspaper editors often manage or help to manage sections, such as business, sports and features. In U.S. newspapers, the level below the top editor is usually the managing editor.

In the book publishing industry, editors may organize anthologies and other compilations, produce definitive editions of a classic author's works (scholarly editor), and organize and manage contributions to a multi-author book (symposium editor or volume editor). Obtaining manuscripts or recruiting authors is the role of an acquisitions editor or a commissioning editor in a publishing house. Finding marketable ideas and presenting them to appropriate authors are the responsibilities of a sponsoring editor.

Copy editors correct spelling, grammar and align writings to house style. Changes to the publishing industry since the 1980s have resulted in nearly all copy editing of book manuscripts being outsourced to freelance copy editors.

At newspapers and wire services, press or copy editors write headlines and work on more substantive issues, such as ensuring accuracy, fairness, and taste. In some positions, they design pages and select news stories for inclusion. At U.K. and Australian newspapers, the term is sub-editor. They may choose the layout of the publication and communicate with the printer. These editors may have the title of layout or design editor or (more so in the past) makeup editor.

Scholarly books and journals
Within the publishing environment, editors of scholarly books are of three main types, each with particular responsibilities:

 Acquisitions editor (or commissioning editor in Britain), who contracts with the author to produce the copy
 Project editor or production editor, who sees the copy through its stages from manuscript to bound book and usually assumes most of the budget and schedule responsibilities
 Copy editor or manuscript editor, who prepares the copy for conversion into printed form.

In the case of multi-author edited volumes, before the manuscript is delivered to the publisher it has undergone substantive and linguistic editing by the volume's editor, who works independently of the publisher.

As for scholarly journals, where spontaneous submissions are more common than commissioned works, the position of journal editor or editor-in-chief replaces the acquisitions editor of the book publishing environment, while the roles of production editor and copy editor remain. However, another editor is sometimes involved in the creation of scholarly research articles. Called the authors' editor, this editor works with authors to get a manuscript fit for purpose before it is submitted to a scholarly journal for publication.

The primary difference between copy editing scholarly books and journals and other sorts of copy editing lies in applying the standards of the publisher to the copy. Most scholarly publishers have a preferred style that usually specifies a particular dictionary and style manual—for example, The Chicago Manual of Style, the MLA Style Manual or the APA Publication Manual in the U.S., or the New Hart's Rules in the U.K.

Technical editing

Technical editing involves reviewing text written on a technical topic, identifying usage errors and ensuring adherence to a style guide.

Technical editing may include the correction of grammatical mistakes, misspellings, mistyping, incorrect punctuation, inconsistencies in usage, poorly structured sentences, wrong scientific terms, wrong units and dimensions, inconsistency in significant figures, technical ambivalence, technical disambiguation, statements conflicting with general scientific knowledge, correction of synopsis, content, index, headings and subheadings, correcting data and chart presentation in a research paper or report, and correcting errors in citations.

Large companies dedicate experienced writers to the technical editing function. Organizations that cannot afford dedicated editors typically have experienced writers peer-edit text produced by less experienced colleagues.

It helps if the technical editor is familiar with the subject being edited. The "technical" knowledge that an editor gains over time while working on a particular product or technology does give the editor an edge over another who has just started editing content related to that product or technology. But essential general skills are attention to detail, the ability to sustain focus while working through lengthy pieces of text on complex topics, tact in dealing with writers, and excellent communication skills.

Editing services

Editing is a growing field of work in the service industry. Paid editing services may be provided by specialized editing firms or by self-employed (freelance) editors.

Editing firms may employ a team of in-house editors, rely on a network of individual contractors or both. Such firms are able to handle editing in a wide range of topics and genres, depending on the skills of individual editors. The services provided by these editors may be varied and can include proofreading, copy editing, online editing, developmental editing, editing for search engine optimization, etc.

Self-employed editors work directly for clients (e.g., authors, publishers) or offer their services through editing firms, or both. They may specialize in a type of editing (e.g., copy editing) and in a particular subject area. Those who work directly for authors and develop professional relationships with them are called authors' editors.

See also
 Audio editing
 Author editing
 Film editing
 Redaction
 Stealth edit
 Textual scholarship
 Video editing
 Writer

Further reading 

 
 Morrison, Blake (6 August 2005) "Black day for the blue pencil"

 Greenberg, Susan L. (2015) Editors talk about editing: insights for readers, writers and publishers, New York: Peter Lang
Munro, Craig (2021) Literary Lion Tamers: book editors who made publishing history, Brunswick, Victoria: Scribe Publications ISBN 9781925713220

References

External links

 
 

 
Journalism occupations
Mass media occupations